The Kenya Gazette is an official publication of the government of the Republic of Kenya, a government gazette.

Contents
The Kenya Gazette publishes the following:
 Notices of new legislation
 Notices required to be published by law or policy
 Announcements for general public information

Publication frequency
Publication takes place every week, usually on Friday, with occasional releases of special or supplementary editions within the week.

Archive search
A search engine for the Kenya Gazette Archive has been developed by the National Council for Law Reporting and Google Inc to enable full-text search within and across Kenya Gazette editions spanning over a century.

References

External links
Government Press Website

Government gazettes
Newspapers published in Kenya
Mass media in Nairobi